Althos is a genus of leaf-footed bugs in the family Coreidae. There are more than 20 described species in Althos.

Species
These 24 species belong to the genus Althos:

 Althos adustus Brailovsky, 1990
 Althos brevicornis (Breddin, 1908)
 Althos cribratissimus Brailovsky, 1990
 Althos distinctus (Signoret, 1864)
 Althos inornatus (Stål, 1862)
 Althos mesoamericanus Brailovsky, 1990
 Althos multicoloratus Brailovsky, 1990
 Althos nervosopunctatus (Signoret, 1864)
 Althos nigropunctatus (Signoret, 1864)
 Althos obscurator (Fabricius, 1803)
 Althos obscurus (Stål, 1870)
 Althos pacificus Brailovsky, 1990
 Althos pallescens (Stål, 1868)
 Althos pallidus (Jensen-Haarup, 1924)
 Althos pallipes (Dallas, 1852)
 Althos paradoxus (Brailovsky, 1982)
 Althos pectoralis (Dallas, 1852)
 Althos pericarti Brailovsky, 1990
 Althos potosinus Brailovsky, 1990
 Althos pseudoobscurus Brailovsky, 1990
 Althos puyoensis Brailovsky, 1990
 Althos sinuaticollis (Spinola, 1852)
 Althos terminalis Brailovsky, 1990
 Althos tucumanensis Brailovsky, 1990

References

Further reading

 

Coreini
Coreidae genera
Articles created by Qbugbot